Adventures is the eighth studio album by Japanese Jazz fusion band T-Square, who was then known as The Square. It was released on April 1, 1984.

Track listing
Sources

Personnel

T-Square
Masahiro Andoh: Electric and acoustic guitars
Takeshi Itoh: Alto saxophone, Lyricon
Hirotaka Izumi: Piano, synthesizers
Toyoyuki Tanaka: Electric bass
Tohru Hasebe: Drums

Additional personnel
Keiko Yamakawa: Harp
Kanesaki Group: Horns
Strings by the Nakanishi Ensemble

References

T-Square (band) albums
1984 albums